The Silver Medal for Bravery (Chinese: 銀英勇勳章, MBS) is the second Medal for Bravery rank in the honours system of Hong Kong.

The medal is awarded for gallantry of an extremely high order.   The Silver Medal for Bravery was created in 1997 to replace the British honours system after the transfer of sovereignty to the People's Republic of China and the establishment of the Hong Kong Special Administrative Region (HKSAR).

List of recipients

1999 
 Mr David Neil Bennet, MBS 
 Mr Cheung Chi-ming, MBS 
 Mr Chan Chiu-ming, MBS 
 Mr Lau Wai-yan, MBS 
 Mr Tam Siu-hung, MBS

2000
 Mr Lee Chi-wah, MBS 
 Mr Choi To, MBS

2001
 Mr Cheung Yat-ming, MBS 
 Mr To Chi-ming, MBS 
 Mr Pang Yuk-wa, MBS 
 Mr Choi Yu-shing, MBS 
 Mr Cheng Kam-wah, MBS

2002
 Mr Leung Shing-yan, MBS (posthumous)

2003
 Ms Wong Kang-tai, MBS (posthumous)
 Mr Lau Wing-kai, MBS (posthumous) 
 Ms Lau Kam-yung, MBS (posthumous) 
 Dr Cheng Ha-yan, Kate, MBS (posthumous) 
 Ms Tang Heung-may, MBS (posthumous) 
 Mr Leung Bo-ming, MBS (posthumous) 
 Mr Hui Chi-leung, MBS
 Mr Ng Ka-man, MBS

2004
 Mr Yip Chi-hang, Czeven, MBS

2005
 Mr Wong Hon, MBS
 Mr Tam Po-ming, MBS

2007
 Captain Chan Chi-pui, Michael, MBS, GMSM
 Captain Wu Wai-hung, MBS
 Mr Chan Siu-kei, MBS
 Mr Chak Hoi-leung, MBS
 Mr Li Yuk-wah, MBS
 Mr Lee Kwok-ming, Thomas, MBS

2014 

 Mr. CHAK Hoi-leung, MBS
 Mr. YUEN Ka-wai, MBS

2016 

 Mr. WAN Kin-wai, MBS

2018 

 Mr. LEE Pak-keung, MBS
 Mr. WONG Sui-ki, MBS
 Mr. SO Chi-wing, Ran, MBS
 Mr. SO Ka-cheung, MBS

2019 

 Mr. HUI Chun-wai, MBS
 Mr. YEUNG Chee-choi, MBS
 Mr. CHUNG Ho-man, MBS

2020 

 Mr. CHU Ki-fung, MBS
 Mr. LING Ka-wai, MBS
 Mr. LEUNG Yat-fai, MBS
 Mr. LEUNG Siu-cheung, Wesley, MBS
 Mr. LEUNG Chun-yin, MBS
 Mr. LAU Tat-ming, MBS
 Mr. TANG Kwong-kwan, MBS

2021 

 Ms. SUEN Wai-mei, MBS
 Mr. LUI Chun-kit, MBS
 Mr. LAI Nestor Ngo-yau, MBS
 Mr. Adam Alexander ROBERTS, MBS

2022 

 Mr. SO King-cho, MBS

References

Lists of Hong Kong people
Awards established in 1997
Civil awards and decorations of Hong Kong